Saint James` church is a late Gothic three-nave church situated in James' square (Jakubské náměstí) in the centre of Brno, in Czech Republic. Its history starts in the beginning of the 13th century. The church was categorized as a national monument in 1995.

History

The church was founded for German inhabitants who lived in this part of the town in the 13th century. There is visible the painted heraldry of mother superior from Oslavany Cistercian monastery with the date 1220 on the vault of the presbytery. This date recalls the consecration of the smaller Romanesque church that once stood here before this late Gothic St. James's church and it used to serve Flemish and German colonists. There are no remains of this church. There was a cemetery documented around the church in the 14th century, which was extended bit by bit in the following years.

During 1368–1405, some chapels were built around the church and these chapels created a unique urbanistic complex. The oldest one was Saint Morris's chapel from the year 1352, and among others were the chapel of Christ's body (1369), Saint Ursuline's chapel and the Assumption of the Virgin chapel (1413), and the so-called New chapel from the year 1428, Saint Trinity chapel (1463) and Saint Dorothy's chapel, which is in the cemetery (1465). The chapel of Christ's body was marked as being connected to the church. Brno citizens made gifts and bequests to these chapels. They also used to give contributions for building costs; however, the main burden of cost was borne by the Cistercian monastery in Oslavany.

Structure

This hall church is characterized by a presbytery with an inner polygon, which is obviously the oldest part. There is a big tower standing at the western part of building. The tower has a  main entrance door. The antechapel was constructed on the northern side.

Late Gothic construction of the parish church started with building up the choir in 1446. The builder in the late 1450s was probably Hans from Brno according to scientific research. The main problem is surely to find out the date when construction began, i.e. the date of establishing the East-oriented presbytery. There is a document about a gift for the construction of the chancel from the year 1469 and the latest research comes with differing opinions as to when construction on the presbytery began. It should date according to documents from the half of the 15th century. This year probably prefers to the finishing of the construction of the chancel. Another opinion puts forth the idea about the earlier construction of the oldest part of the presbytery. This idea is supported by some architectonic details, for example the axial placing of the buttress which recalls Petr Parléř's construction at the Southern hall in Saint Vitus cathedral in Prague and in the presbytery of Saint Bartholomew's in Kolín upon Elbe. Also the structure of the wall profile between the windows and the shape of the window tracery repeats some of Parléř's characteristic motifs and possibly floral ornaments and beautiful gargoyles at the top of the buttresses which are close to work from Parléř's area. It could be hardly made as special kind of historicism in the half of the 15th century. It is possible to consider the origin of the presbytery and so the project of the new church at the end of the 14th century. Norbert Nussbaum pointed out to details of the shaft work, which passes through the windows jambs and the compound piers. It shows knowledge of the forms, which were used in the lodge at the Cathedral of St. Stephan in Vienna, when there was a master Lorenz Spenning.

Petr Kroupa, who made research about the history of this church's construction, came to the conclusion that the presbytery was finished in 1473 and there are some similarities with the presbytery at the Church of the Holy Spirit in Heidelberg, where the same vaulting is used in the hall choir gallery. The vault belongs to the area of Swabia net vaults. Petr Kroupa considered Master Hans as a designer of Jacob's choir vault for as much as it was documented (as "Meister zu Brünn" - Master at Brno) at a stonecutters' meeting in Regensburg in 1459.

The antechapel was constructed on the northern side. There is a stone in this antechapel, which is marked by Anton Pilgram's stone sign and written text: "1502 Ist Angela/n/gen dy Seiten" (In 1502 they started building of side walls). It is known from documents that Anton Pilgram worked here in 1500 – 1511. Then he went to Vienna to work on the structure of Saint Stephen's Cathedral.

In 1515 the finished presbytery was affected by the fire that caused the roof to fall in and it subsequently destroyed all altars. The new main altar was consecrated in 1516. The stone relief called the Lamentation of Christ comes from the year 1518 and the relief of the Crucifixion is from 1519. The written marked date 1526 declares that the stone staircase up to the pulpit was finished in 1526. However, the pulpit acquired its present shape in 1669. Next covering in roof was probably done before 1530. The three-aisled roof was vaulted by the builder Pietro Gabri, who was an Italian who had settled in Brno, about 1570. The doubled stone staircase at the main tower with access into the choir was done in 1581. In the same year Wolf Nagel finished the choir. In 1692 Jakub Ryšák, who was an organ builder from Opava, delivered new organs.

The building of the churchtower started in the 1520s and in 1592 Antonio Gabrin heightened the tower. He added the part with the clock, and the whole tower was finished by Šimon Tauch who put on the top the Renaissance canopy. The tower's height is 94 m. During the Thirty Years' War, the church was not damaged; so it was not necessary to rebuild it and thanks to this its predominantly florid Gothic shape has stayed conserved.

Renovations

The Baroque interior style was done in 1750-1766. During this rebuilding the older wooden altars were removed and replaced by new marble ones which are still there. In 1871 – 1879 the church was radically reconstructed into the Gothic Revival style led by Heinrich Ferstel. The outside additional buildings and their remnants were removed because they did not contribute to the church's garnish. Mr Ferstel removed the Gothic hall and the minor chapels in the south part of the church. He destroyed the above-mentioned Pilgram's work at the sacristy on the North side. He built a storey above the sacristy and gave it a new roof. Inside of the church he removed all minor baroque Baroque and two galleries. The upper part of the outside buttresses with old gargoyles were replaced with new copies and stone architectural parts as phials, rosettes and flowers were replaced for the most part as well.

The blank Gothic windows on the South and North side were tapped. The parts of window flanning and tracery were also repaired properly. 
The Gothic Revival parsonage designed by Alois Prastorfer and Germano Wanderley was built in 1900 - 1901.
The cemetery, which had been around the church, was liquidated about the year of 1787 and the complex of above-mentioned chapels was abolished bit by bit together with it. Subsequently, a few gravestones were moved into the church and nowadays there are six of them.

Legends
There is a famous Brno legend connected with Saint James's church. The legend is about an indecent man, who is visible in one of the window arches in the south side of the church near Svoboda square. The man is showing his naked bottom in the direction of Saint Peter and Paul's cathedral. It all arises from a competition between the two churches to build the higher churchtower. The bottom directed towards Petrov means that Saint James's church won the competition, because its tower is 94 m high, whereas Petrov tower is about 10 m lower, at only 84 m high.

Few know that there is not only one man, but rather two.  "It was evidently a stonecutter's joke when he put such statues on the ecclesiastical building" says Jindřich Chatrný from the department of Architecture and Urbanism history in the Museum of Brno city.

In 2001, archeological exploration revealed the size of Brno Ossuary, an ossuary underneath the square by the church, which is estimated to contain the remains of 50,000 people.

References

Literature
 Bretholz, Bertold. Die Pfarrkirche St. Jakob in Brünn. Brno: R.M. Rohrer, 1901
 Hálová-Jahodová, Cecilie. Brno, stavební a umělecký vývoj města. 1. vyd. Praha: Pražské nakladatelství V. Poláčka, 1947
 Chamonikola, Kaliopi; Martyčáková, Alena. Od gotiky k renesanci: výtvarná kultura Moravy a Slezska 1400-1550: [katalog výstavy] 2. 1. vyd. Brno: Moravská galerie, 1999. 
 Libor, Jan. Dějiny Brna 2, Středověké město. 1. vyd. Brno: Statutární město Brno, 2013. 
 Kučca, Karel. Brno: vývoj města, předměstí a připojených vesnic. 1. vyd. Praha: Baset, 2000
 Samek, Bohumil. Umělecké památky Moravy a Slezska 1. A-I. Praha: Academia, 1994
 Šefců, Ondřej. Architektura: lexikon architektonických prvků a stavebního řemesla. 1. vyd. Praha: Grada, 2013.

External links

 Discoverczech website
 http://www.gotobrno.cz/en/the-ossuary-of-st-james-church
http://www.czechtourism.com/c/brno-st-james-church/

Churches in Brno
Gothic architecture in the Czech Republic
National Cultural Monuments of the Czech Republic